The 2021 Sun Belt Conference men's basketball tournament was the postseason men's basketball tournament for Sun Belt Conference during the 2020–21 NCAA Division I men's basketball season. All tournament games were played at Pensacola Bay Center & the Hartsell Center at Pensacola State College between March 5–8.  The winner received the Sun Belt's automatic bid to the 2021 NCAA tournament.

Seeds
All 12 conference teams qualified for the tournament. Due to the COVID-19 pandemic, teams were seeded by their place in their division. The top two teams from each division received a bye into the quarterfinals.

Schedule

Bracket

* denotes overtime period

References

Tournament
Sun Belt Conference men's basketball tournament
Sports in Pensacola, Florida
College basketball tournaments in Florida
Sun Belt Conference men's basketball tournament
Sun Belt Conference men's basketball tournament